The singles discography of South Korean girl group Twice consists of thirty-six singles and ten promotional singles. The group was formed by JYP Entertainment in July 2015 through the survival television show Sixteen.

In South Korea, the group debuted in October 2015 with the release of the single, "Like Ooh-Ahh" becoming their first top ten single in the country. The group would later earn nine consecutive number-ones from 2016 to 2018; "Cheer Up", "TT", "Knock Knock", "Signal", "Likey", "Heart Shaker", "What Is Love?", "Dance the Night Away" and "Yes or Yes". Subsequent singles from 2019 to 2021; "Fancy", "Feel Special", "More & More", "I Can't Stop Me" and "Alcohol-Free", all peaked inside the top ten. All remaining Korean singles from 2018 to 2023; "The Best Thing I Ever Did", "Cry for Me", "Scientist", "Talk That Talk" and "Set Me Free" charted at the top 200. "What Is Love?", "Dance the Night Away", "Yes or Yes", and "Fancy" also a received platinum certification from the Korea Music Content Association (KMCA) for achieving 100 million streams.

In Japan, the group's first two Japanese singles, "One More Time" and "Candy Pop", were certified platinum by the Recording Industry Association of Japan (RIAJ). While the third single, "Wake Me Up", became the first physical single by a foreign female artist to earn a double platinum certification. The group's subsequent Japanese singles, "Happy Happy", "Breakthrough", and "Fanfare", also received platinum certifications.

In United States, the group's English singles, "The Feels" and "Moonlight Sunrise" both charted on the Billboard Hot 100, with the former earning a Gold Certification from Recording Industry Association of America (RIAA).

To date, Twice has earned nine number-one singles in Gaon Digital Chart, six number-one singles on the K-pop Hot 100, four number-one singles in Oricon Singles Chart, five number-one singles on the Billboard Japan Hot 100 and four number-one singles on the 
World Digital Song Sales.

Singles

Promotional singles

Other charted songs

Notes

References

 
Discographies of South Korean artists
K-pop music group discographies